Perdita swenki is a species of bee in the family Andrenidae. It is found in North America. It is known to visit: Chrysopsis, Grindelia, Helianthus maximillianii, Liatris, Solidago juncea, and Solidago rigida.

References 

Andrenidae
Insects described in 1915